Unió Deportiva Arenal is a football team based in S'Arenal de Llucmajor, Balearic Islands. Founded in 1970, the team plays in Primera Regional Preferente.

The club's home ground is Estadio Son Verí.

Season to season 

19 seasons in Tercera División

Notable players
 Nate Weiss

References

External links
Official website
ffib.es profile
Futbolme.com profile

Football clubs in the Balearic Islands
Sport in Mallorca
Association football clubs established in 1970
Divisiones Regionales de Fútbol clubs
Llucmajor
1970 establishments in Spain